Cessnock Correctional Centre, an Australian minimum and maximum security prison for males, is located in Cessnock, New South Wales. The centre is operated by Corrective Services NSW an agency of the Department of Justice of the Government of New South Wales. The centre detains sentenced and unsentenced felons under New South Wales and/or Commonwealth legislation.

Facilities were significantly updated during 2012, including the completion of Australia's first purpose-built maximum security sex offenders unit; built at a cost of 97 million. The centre serves as the reception prison for the Newcastle and Hunter Region.

Notable prisoners
 Nathan Baggaley a former Olympic sprint canoer, jailed between 2009 and 2011 for dealing ecstasy.
 William MacDonald English-born Australian serial killer (born Allen Ginsberg, 1924–2015)
 Lenny McPherson (1921-1996) organised crime figure.
 Harry M. Miller (1934-2018) New Zealand-Australian media agent, promoter and publicist, convicted of fraud. 
 Nigel MilsomArchibald Prize-winning painter, armed robbery.
 Ray Williamsdisgraced businessman.

See also

References

External links
 

Maximum security prisons in Australia
Prisons in New South Wales
City of Cessnock
Buildings and structures completed in 1972
1972 establishments in Australia